Bintliff is a surname. Notable people with the surname include:

Barbara A. Bintliff, American lawyer
James Bintliff (1824–1901), American Civil War colonel